Fairoaks may refer to:
 Fairoaks, Arkansas, alternate name of Fair Oaks, Arkansas
 Fairoaks, California, former name of Fair Oaks, Mendocino County, California
 Fairoaks Airport
Fairoaks (novel), a 1957 novel by Frank Yerby

See also
Fair Oaks (disambiguation)